Grafing Stadt station is a railway station in the municipality of Grafing, located in the Ebersberg district in Upper Bavaria, Germany.

References

External links

Munich S-Bahn stations
Railway stations in Bavaria
Railway stations in Germany opened in 1899
1899 establishments in Bavaria
Buildings and structures in Ebersberg (district)